Mitochondrially encoded tRNA methionine also known as MT-TM is a transfer RNA which in humans is encoded by the mitochondrial MT-TM gene.

MT-TM is a small 68 nucleotide RNA (human mitochondrial map position 4402-4469) that transfers the amino acid methionine to a growing polypeptide chain at the ribosome site of protein synthesis during translation.

References